Sheykhanbar (also Romanized as Sheykhānbar; also known as Sheikhaneh Sar and Sheykhānehvar) is a village in Layalestan Rural District, in the Central District of Lahijan County, Gilan Province, Iran. At the 2006 census, its population was 952, in 273 families.

References 

Populated places in Lahijan County